Ivan Vandor (13 October 1932 – 15 November 2020) was an Italian composer, musician and ethnomusicologist of Hungarian origin.

Life
Born in Pécs, Vandor moved in Rome, Italy with his family in 1938.

He began studying violin at 6 and piano at 8, and, from 1948 to 1954, was tenor sax in the group Roman New Orleans Jazz Band. He was later also member of the avant-garde groups Musica Elettronica Viva and Gruppo di Improvvisazione di Nuova Consonanza. In 1959 he graduated in Composition with Goffredo Petrassi at the Santa Cecilia Conservatory and in 1962 he obtained Italian citizenship.

Graduated in ethnomusicology at U.C.L.A., he authored several books and essays. His compositions include several notable soundtracks, such as Mino Guerrini's Omicidio per appuntamento (1967), Giulio Questi's Django Kill (1967), Nelo Risi's Diary of a Schizophrenic Girl (1968) and Michelangelo Antonioni's The Passenger (1975).

References

External links 
 
 Ivan Vandor at Discogs

1932 births
2020 deaths
Italian film score composers
Italian male film score composers
Hungarian emigrants to Italy
People from Pécs
Ethnomusicologists
University of California alumni
Accademia Nazionale di Santa Cecilia alumni